
Gmina Skępe is an urban-rural gmina (administrative district) in Lipno County, Kuyavian-Pomeranian Voivodeship, in north-central Poland.

Villages
Apart from the town of Skępe, Gmina Skępe contains the villages and settlements of Babie Ławy, Boguchwała, Bógzapłać, Chałacie, Czarny Las, Czermno, Franciszkowo, Gęstowarka, Głęboczek, Gorzeszyn, Grabówiec, Guzowatka, Huta, Jarczewo, Józefkowo, Kamienica, Kierz, Koziołek, Kujawy, Kukowo, Łąkie, Ławiczek, Likiec, Lubówiec, Moczadła, Modrzewie, Narutowo, Pokrzywnik, Radziochy, Rumunki, Sarnowo, Skępskie, Szczekarzewo, Wioska, Wólka, Żagno, Zajeziorze and Żuchowo.

Neighbouring gminas
Gmina Skępe is bordered by the gminas of Chrostkowo, Lipno, Mochowo, Rogowo, Sierpc, Szczutowo, Tłuchowo and Wielgie.

References
Polish official population figures 2006

Skepe
Lipno County